The Gioconda Smile is a 1964 Australian television play based on a play by Aldous Huxley (which had originally been written as a short story). It was filmed in Melbourne.

Plot
Henry Hutton is a wealthy man who lives in an English country house with his crippled wife, Emily, who is looked after by Nurse Braddock. Their neighbour is Janet Spence, an unmarried woman who looks after her crippled father and is in love with Henry. When Emily dies, Janet declares her love, but Henry is going to marry a younger woman. Then Nurse Braddock thinks the death might not be natural and demands an autopsy.

Cast
{{Cast listing|* Alexander Hay as Henry Hutton
 Elizabeth Wing as Janet Spence
 Fay Kelton as Doris
 Williams Lloyd as Dr Libbard
 Roma Johnston as Nurse Braddock
 Kevin Colebrook
 Joan Letch

Production
The play began as a short story which had been turned into a 1948 stage play. This was then adapted into a TV play.

Reception
The Sydney Morning Herald TV critic thought that the adaptation had "little left of this story' s original quality... the action and sets were curiously stiff and limited by TV standards, although some Hitchcock horror close-ups and the background music of a hysterical harpsichord added to its pretensions as a "whodunnit.""

References

External links

Australian drama television films
1964 television plays